This is a list of flag bearers who have represented the Gambia at the Olympics.

Flag bearers carry the national flag of their country at the opening ceremony of the Olympic Games.

See also
Gambia at the Olympics

References

The Gambia at the Olympics
Gambia
Olympic flagbearers
Olympic flagbearers